Eolia is an unincorporated community in Letcher County, Kentucky, United States.

References

Unincorporated communities in Letcher County, Kentucky
Unincorporated communities in Kentucky